Turritella yucatecana is a species of sea snail, a marine gastropod mollusk in the family Turritellidae.

Description 
The maximum recorded shell length is 16.5 mm.

Habitat 
Minimum recorded depth is 1170 m. Maximum recorded depth is 1170 m.

References

External links

Turritellidae
Gastropods described in 1881